Clarence Lake is a lake in Clarence-Steepbank Lakes Provincial Park in the Canadian province of Saskatchewan. The lake is in a glacier-carved valley in the Boreal forest ecozone of Canada and is part of the Bow River chain of lakes at the headwaters of the Bow River, which is a tributary of Lac la Ronge in the Churchill River watershed.

Clarence Lake is the easiest lake in the park to access as it's only 500 metres from Highway 927 and, with five campsites at its northern end, it's the only lake in the park with vehicle accessible camping. Northern pike, walleye, and lake trout are fish commonly found in the lake. The road that gives access to Clarence Lake from the highway also gives access to other lakes in the Bow River chain, including Hayes, Kit, Jasper, Ridge, and Steepbank Lakes.

See also 
List of lakes of Saskatchewan
Tourism in Saskatchewan

References 

Lakes of Saskatchewan
Northern Saskatchewan Administration District